A tuya is a distinctive, flat-topped, steep-sided volcano.

Tuya may refer to:

Places in northern British Columbia, Canada
 Tuya Butte, a flat-topped volcano; the source of the name tuya for that type of volcano
 The Tuya Range, a mountain range
 Tuya Lake
 Tuya River
 Little Tuya River, a tributary of the Tuya River

Other uses
 Queen Tuya, an ancient Egyptian queen
 Thuya, an ancient Egyptian noblewoman
 "Tuya" (song), 2007, by Jennifer Peña
 Tuya Inc., a Chinese software company focused on the development of IoT solutions